David J. Love is an American professor of engineering at Purdue University. He completed his B.S. and M.S. degrees, both in electrical engineering, at the University of Texas at Austin in 2000 and 2002, respectively. He received his Ph.D. in electrical engineering from UT Austin in 2004 under the supervision of Robert W. Heath Jr. Love was appointed as an assistant professor at Purdue University in 2004. In 2009, he was promoted to associate professor, and in 2013, he was made full professor. In 2012, he was recognized as a University Faculty Scholar at Purdue. In 2018, he was named a Reilly Professor of Electrical and Computer Engineering at Purdue.

Professional career
While at UT Austin, Love worked alongside Robert Heath Jr. to pioneer MIMO feedback strategies (limited feedback precoding), a form of which is currently found in IEEE 802.11 WLAN, Wimax cellular, and LTE cellular standards, especially Grassmannian beamforming. Much of his current research is dedicated to communication at millimeter wave frequencies and distributed and massive MIMO systems. He won an IEEE Signal Processing Society best paper award in 2015 for work on massive MIMO. He received the IEEE Communications Society Stephen O. Rice Prize in the Field of Communications Theory for his work on millimeter wave communication.

Professional activities
Love is a Fellow of the IEEE. He has been particularly involved in the Signal Processing Society, Communication Society, Information Theory Society, and the Vehicular Technology Society branches of the organization. He was Editor (2008-2011) of the IEEE Transactions on Communications and was Associate Editor (2011-2013) of the IEEE Transactions on Signal Processing.

Selected publications
D. J. Love, R. W. Heath Jr.,  and T. Strohmer, Grassmannian Beamforming for Multiple-Input Multiple-Output Wireless Systems, IEEE Trans. on Info. Theory special issue on MIMO Communication, vol. 49, pp. 2735-2747, Oct. 2003.

S. Hur, T. Kim, D. J. Love, J. V. Krogmeier, T. A. Thomas, A. Ghosh, Millimeter Wave Beamforming for Wireless Backhaul and Access in Small Cell Networks, IEEE Trans. Communications vol. 61, no. 10, pp. 4391-4403, Oct. 2013.

J. Choi, D. J. Love, and P. Bidigare, “Downlink Training Techniques for FDD Massive MIMO Systems: Open-Loop and Closed-Loop Training with Memory,” IEEE Journal of Selected Topics in Signal Pro- cessing, vol. 8, no. 5, pp. 802–814, Oct. 2014.

D. J. Love, R. W. Heath Jr.,  and T. Strohmer, Grassmannian Beamforming for Multiple-Input Multiple-Output Wireless Systems, IEEE Trans. on Info. Theory special issue on MIMO Communication, vol. 49, pp. 2735-2747, Oct. 2003.

References

Cockrell School of Engineering alumni
Living people
American electrical engineers
1979 births